Bellevalia desertorum is a species of flowering plant in the family Asparagaceae, native to Israel, Jordan and the Sinai Peninsula.

References

Scilloideae
Flora of Palestine (region)
Flora of Sinai
Plants described in 1932